Lady Macbeth of the Mtsensk District ( Ledi Makbet Mtsenskovo uyezda) is an 1865 novella by Nikolai Leskov. It was originally published in Fyodor Dostoyevsky's magazine Epoch.

Among its themes are the subordinate role expected from women in 19th-century European society, adultery, provincial life (thus drawing comparison with Flaubert's Madame Bovary) and the planning of murder by a woman, hence the title inspired by the Shakespearean character Lady Macbeth from his play Macbeth. The title also echoes the title of Turgenev's story Hamlet of the Shchigrovsky District (1859).

Plot summary
Chapter 1
The Ismailov family is introduced: Boris, the father of Zinovy, the husband of Katerina for the past five years.  Boris and Zinovy are merchants, ruling an estate with many serfs.  Katerina is bored in their empty home, and tired of Boris' constant orders and scolding of her for not producing any children.  She would actually welcome a child, and Zinovy's previous wife of twenty years fared no better.

Chapter 2
A dam bursts at a mill owned by Boris, and Zinovy leaves town to oversee its repair.  Aksinya, the female cook, and Sergei, a newly arrived farmhand, are introduced.  Katerina flirts somewhat innocently with Sergei.  Aksinya tells Katerina, who has become bored enough to venture out amongst the peasants, of Sergei's reputation as a womanizer.

Chapter 3
Sergei comes into Katerina's room, and after some dialogue about romance, moves to kiss her roughly.  She protests at first, but then gives in; after an implied sexual encounter, she tells Sergei to leave because Boris will be coming by to lock her door.  He stays, saying he can use the window instead.

Chapter 4
After a week of the continued affair, Boris catches Sergei and accuses him of adultery. Sergei will neither admit nor deny it, so Boris whips him until his own arm hurts from the exertion, and locks Sergei in a cellar. Katerina seems to come alive from her boredom, but Boris threatens to beat her as well when she asks for Sergei's release.

Chapter 5
Katerina poisons Boris by putting arsenical rat poison in a dish of mushrooms and kasha, and he is buried in the absence of his son - without incurring suspicion, because many have died from mistaking poisonous mushrooms for edible ones. She then takes charge of the estate and begins to order people around, openly being around Sergei every day.

Chapter 6
Katerina has a strange dream about a cat.  Some dialogue occurs with Sergei, which by its end reveals his worry over Zinovy's return and desire to marry her.

Chapter 7
Katerina again dreams of the cat, which this time has Boris's head rather than a cat's. Zinovy returns and takes some time to get around to confronting Katerina with what he has heard about her affair. Finally she calls Sergei in, kisses him in front of her husband, some violence occurs, and the two of them strangle Zinovy.

Chapter 8
Zinovy dies, and Sergei buries him deep in the walls of the cellar where he himself had been kept.

Chapter 9
Some convenient circumstances regarding Zinovy's return shroud his disappearance in mystery, and while there is an inquiry, nothing is found and no trouble comes to Sergei or Katerina. The latter becomes pregnant. Everything seems to be working out for them, until Boris's young nephew Fyodor shows up with his mother, preventing Katerina from inheriting the estate. She has no problem with this and actually makes an effort to be a good aunt, but Sergei complains repeatedly for a time about their misfortune.

Chapter 10
Fyodor falls ill, and Katerina, while tending to him, has a change of heart because of Sergei's earlier complaints.

Chapter 11
Katerina and Sergei suffocate the boy, but a crowd returning from church storms the house, one of its members having spied the act through the shutters of Fyodor's room.  Sergei, hearing the windows clattering from the crowd's fists, thinks the ghosts of his murder victims have come back to haunt him, and breaks down.

Chapter 12
Sergei admits to the crime publicly and, in repentance, also tells of where Zinovy is buried and admits to that crime as well.  Katerina indifferently admits that she helped with the murders, saying it was all for Sergei.  The two are sent to exile in Siberia.  During their journey there, Katerina gives birth in a prison hospital, and wants nothing to do with their child.

Chapter 13
The child is sent to be raised by Fyodor's mother and becomes heir to the Ismailov estate.  Katerina continues to be obsessed with Sergei, who increasingly wants nothing to do with her.  Fiona and "little Sonya," two members of the prison convoy with Katerina and Sergei, are introduced, the former being known for being sexually prolific, the latter the opposite.

Chapter 14
Sergei is caught by Katerina being intimate with Fiona. Katerina is mortified, but seeing Fiona's indifference to the whole situation, reaches something approaching cordiality with Fiona by writing her off. Sergei then pursues little Sonya, who will not sleep with him unless he gives her a pair of stockings. He then complains to Katerina about his ankle-cuffs. She, being happy that he is talking to her again, readily gives him her last pair of new stockings to ease his pain, which he then gives to Sonya in return for sexual favours.

Chapter 15
Katerina sees Sonya wearing her stockings; she spits in Sergei's eyes, and shoves him. He promises revenge, and later breaks into her cell with another man, giving her fifty lashes with a rope, while her cell-mate Sonya giggles in the background. Katerina, broken, lets Fiona console her, and realizes that she is no better than Fiona, which is her breaking-point: after that she is emotionless. On the road in the prison convoy, Sergei and Sonya together mock Katerina. Sonya offers her stockings to her for sale. Sergei reminisces about both their courtship and their murders in the same airy manner. Fiona and an old man in the convoy, Gordyushka, defend Katerina, but to no avail. The convoy arrives at a river and boards a ferry, and Katerina, repeating some phrases similar to Sergei's feigned nostalgia for their life at the estate, sets upon Sonya; they both end up in the river after Katerina has seen the faces of Boris, Zinovy, and Fyodor in the water. The two women briefly resurface, still alive, but Katerina grabs Sonya, and they both drown.

Translations into English 

 A. E. Chamot (1922)
 George H. Hanna (1958)
 David McDuff (1988)
 Robert Chandler (2003)
 Richard Pevear and Larissa Volokhonsky (2013)

Adaptations
 Opera: the 1934 opera of the same name by Dmitri Shostakovich
 Ballet: Lady Macbeth '77 (Katarina Izmailova) by Yugoslav composer Rudolf Brucci
 Film: the 1962 Yugoslavian film Sibirska Ledi Magbet (Siberian Lady Macbeth) directed by Andrzej Wajda
 Film: the 1989 Soviet film Lady Macbeth of the Mtsensk District by Roman Balayan
 Film: the 2016 British film by William Oldroyd, Lady Macbeth.

External links
 
 Full text of Lady Macbeth of the Mtsensk District in the original Russian
 Full Text of Lady Macbeth of Mtsensk in an English translation by Richard Pevear and Larissa Volokhonsky

Novellas by Nikolai Leskov
1865 Russian novels
Adultery in novels
Fictional Russian people in literature
Russian novels adapted into films
Novels adapted into operas